The 2014 American Solar Challenge (ASC) was an intercollegiate solar car race on July 21–28, 2014. The event was won by the University of Michigan. It was the 12th American national championship solar car race held.

Route
Day 1: Sat, July 21: Start in Austin, Texas; must reach Weatherford, TX checkpoint.
Day 2: Sun, July 22: Finish in Norman, Oklahoma.
Day 3: Mon, July 23: Start in Norman, OK; must reach Wichita, Kansas checkpoint.
Day 4: Tue, July 24: Finish in Overland Park, KS.
Day 5: Wed, July 25: Start in Overland Park, KS; must reach stage stop in Omaha, Nebraska.
Day 6: Thu, July 26: Start in Omaha, NE; must reach Ames, Iowa checkpoint.
Day 7: Fri, July 27: Finish in La Crosse, Wisconsin.
Day 8: Sat, July 28: Start in La Crosse, WI; finish in Minneapolis, Minnesota.

Results

Overall

Inspector Awards
Electrical Design Award: Principia
Mechanical Design Award: Iowa State
Safety Award: Oregon State
Most Arduous Journey: QIAU HAVIN
Teamwork Award: Oregon State
Spirit of the Event: Polytechnique Montreal
Solar Car Lifetime Achievement Award: Abraham Poot

Stage 1

Stage 2

Stage 3

Stage 4

Stage 5

References

External links
 2014 American Solar Challenge

American Solar Challenge